Pterolophia zebrina is a species of beetle in the family Cerambycidae. It was described by Pascoe in 1858, originally under the genus Hathlia. It is known from India, China, Thailand, Taiwan, and Vietnam.

References

zebrina
Beetles described in 1858